Mycoplasma pneumonia (also known as "walking pneumonia") is a form of bacterial pneumonia caused by the bacterial species Mycoplasma pneumoniae. It is also known as PPLO, which is an acronym for Pleuro Pneumonia Like Organism.

Pathophysiology
Mycoplasma pneumoniae is spread through respiratory droplet transmission. Once attached to the mucosa of a host organism, M. pneumoniae extracts nutrients, grows, and reproduces by binary fission. Attachment sites include the upper and lower respiratory tract, causing pharyngitis, bronchitis, and pneumonia. The infection caused by this bacterium is called atypical pneumonia because of its protracted course and lack of sputum production and wealth of extrapulmonary symptoms. Chronic Mycoplasma infections have been implicated in the pathogenesis of rheumatoid arthritis and other rheumatological diseases.

Mycoplasma atypical pneumonia can be complicated by Stevens–Johnson syndrome, autoimmune hemolytic anemia, cardiovascular diseases, encephalitis, or Guillain–Barré syndrome.

Diagnosis
M. pneumoniae infections can be differentiated from other types of pneumonia by the relatively slow progression of symptoms.  A positive blood test for cold-hemagglutinins in 50–70% of patients after 10 days of infection (cold-hemagglutinin-test should be used with caution or not at all, since 50% of the tests are false-positive), lack of bacteria in a Gram-stained sputum sample, and a lack of growth on blood agar.

PCR has also been used.

Treatment
While antibiotics with activity specifically against M. pneumoniae are often used (e.g., erythromycin, doxycycline), it is unclear if these result in greater benefit than using antibiotics without specific activity against this organism in those with an infection acquired in the community.

See also
Mycoplasmal pneumonia of swine

References

External links 

Pneumonia
Bacterial diseases